Robert Barr Smith (4 February 1824 – 20 November 1915) was an Australian businessman and philanthropist in Adelaide, South Australia. He was a partner in Elder Smith and Company from 1863 (now now Elders Limited).

Early life and education
Smith was born at Lochwinnoch, Renfrewshire, Scotland, the son of the Rev. Dr Robert Smith, a Church of Scotland minister, and his wife Marjory, née Barr.

He studied for a time at the University of Glasgow.

Career
Barr Smith went into business after university and afterwards emigrated to Melbourne, where he was a member of the firm of Hamilton, Smith and Company in 1854. In 1855 he joined Elder and Company at Adelaide and became a partner in the business which from 1863 was known as Elder Smith and Company, now Elders Limited.

Barr Smith also took up land and became a large owner in South Australia, Victoria, New South Wales and Queensland. When the Wallaroo and Moonta copper mines got into difficulties, Elder Smith and Company made large advances to them until more profitable times came.

Barr Smith made a name for himself as a financial authority, and though he declined to enter political or municipal life, his advice was frequently sought by politicians and members of the business community of Adelaide. It has been stated that in the 1893 bank crisis he was besieged by crowds of people seeking guidance.

Barr Smith was on the boards of the public library (State Library of South Australia) and of Adelaide Botanic Garden, and was a director of several companies. He was a keen judge and lover of horses, his colours were frequently seen at race meetings in South Australia and Victoria, and he was president for a time of the South Australian Coursing Club.

Philanthropy

Barr Smith was said to be an upright and modest man with intellectual sympathies. He shrank from publicity and he was said to have refused the offer of a knighthood. 

Barr Smith's private charities were many, and he received a large amount of "begging-letter" mail. These letters were dealt with systematically and all deserving cases were helped. Barr Smith was a member of the Council of the University of Adelaide for 19 years. Among the larger sums distributed were £9000 to buy books for the university library, £10,000 to complete the St Peter's Cathedral spires, £3500 for a steam life-boat and in 1908, £2300 to pay off debts on the Trades Hall. Barr Smith contributed largely to exploration funds, the observatory established on Mount Kosciuszko was paid for by him, and he was mainly responsible for the expenses of the first South Australian rifle team sent to Bisley.

Personal life, death and legacy

In 1856 Barr Smith married Joanna Elder, sister of Sir Thomas Elder, also Scottish migrants to the colony.

In 1878, the couple paid £3000 for a piece of land in Mount Barker that included the Oakfield Hotel (opened 1860, owned by Lachlan MacFarlane). They planned and built a 30-roomed mansion in French Renaissance style around the existing hotel, to be used as their family's summer home. They later assigned the name Auchendarroch (later known as Auchendarroch House), which originates from the Scottish Gaelic language word for "holy place of the oaks", and proceeded to plant a lot of oak trees on the property. They assigned  each for an orchard and a garden, with hedges planted around the whole property. The garden included large lawns and many English trees, including cedars, chestnuts, maples, conifers, and around 50 oak trees. It also had flower beds and vegetable gardens, with the produce given away in the community.

Barr Smith died of "senile decay" on 20 November 1915, and Joanna died in 1919. Auchendarroch was sold in 1921 to the  Memorial Hospital and used as a convalescent home. It was later acquired by the Wallis family, owners of Wallis Cinemas. 

In 1920 his family gave £11,000 for the endowment of the library of the University of Adelaide.

Family
Joanna and Robert were survived by a son and three daughters.

Brother-in-law: Sir Thomas Elder (1818-1897)

Son: Tom Elder Barr Smith (1863-1941)  
Grandson: Sir Tom Elder Barr Smith (1904-1968)

Third daughter: Joanna  Fitzgerald Barr Smith (1866 – ) married George Charles Hawker, jun. (c. 1854 – 15 February 1889), son of George Charles Hawker, in 1886.
Fourth daughter: Marjory Erlistoun Barr Smith (1868 – 3 August 1913) married William Mitchell on 18 January 1900

See also
Barr Smith Library

References

1824 births
1915 deaths
Businesspeople from Adelaide
Settlers of South Australia
Robert
Adelaide Club
Scottish emigrants to Australia
19th-century Australian businesspeople